Kayano (written: 茅野 or 萱野) is a Japanese surname. Notable people with the surname include:

, Japanese voice actress
, Japanese Samurai
, last native speaker of the Ainu language

Fictional characters
, one of the main characters in the manga/anime series Assassination Classroom

Japanese-language surnames